Lee Sievan (1907–1990) was an American photographer. Initially self-taught as a photographer, she later took classes at the New School for Social Research and the American Artists School. Sievan was a member of the New York Photo League. Her work is included in the collections of the Smithsonian American Art Museum,
the Metropolitan Museum of Art,  the National Portrait Gallery, Washington
and the International Center of Photography,

References

1907 births
1990 deaths
Artists from New York City
20th-century American women artists
20th-century American photographers
Artists in the Smithsonian American Art Museum collection